Trevor Huddleston may refer to:

Trevor Huddleston, former Anglican archbishop of the Indian Ocean
Trevor Huddleston (racing driver), stock car racing driver